Table football (foosball) is an in-table game using player figurese attached to rotating rods.

Table football or table soccer may also refer to:

 Tabletop football, a class of tabletop games that simulate various forms of football, with moving or fixed gamepieces representing players on a pitch/field
 Subbuteo, a brand of these games
 Sports table football, tabletop football as a competitive sport of its own
 Button football, a tabletop game using disks as "players"
 Penny football, a simpler coin game played on a tabletop

See also
 List of types of football
 Coin football (disambiguation)